These are the results of 2021 BWF World Senior Championships' 40+ events.

Men's singles 

 Oliver Colin (fourth round)
 Conrad Hückstädt (quarter-finals)
 Naruenart Chuaymak (bronze medalist)
 Morten Eilby Rasmussen (fourth round)
 Marcus Jansson (fourth round)
 Alex Marritt (silver medalist)
 Björn Wippich (third round)
 Casper Lund (gold medalist)
 Juuso Atrila (fourth round)
 Abhinn Shyam Gupta (quarter-finals)
 Jhony Hidayat (Forth Round)
 Dawid Krawiec (third round)
 Tryggvi Nielsen (second round)
 Eric Wasylyk (quarter-finals)
 Fredrik du Hane (withdrew)
 Antti Koljonen (fourth round)

Finals

Top half

Section 1

Section 2

Section 3

Section 4

Bottom half

Section 5

Section 6

Section 7

Section 8

Women's singles

Seeds 

 Claudia Vogelgsang (gold medalist)
 Katja Wengberg (quarter-finals)
 Dominika Guzik-Płuchowska (bronze medalist)
 Stefanie Schmidt (bronze medalist)
 Stephanie Cloarec (silver medalist)
 Pooja Mehta (quarter-finals)
 Ulla Pedersen (third round)
 Cecilia Närfors (third round)

Finals

Top half

Section 1

Section 2

Bottom half

Section 3

Section 4

Men's doubles

Seeds 

 Tommy Sørensen / Jesper Thomsen (gold medalists)
 Esben B. Kæmpegaard / Morten Eilby Rasmussen (third round)
 Samir Abbasi / Upendra Fadnis (bronze medalists)
 Marcus Jansson / Björn Sidfalk (quarter-finals)
 Mark Constable / Alex Marritt (quarter-finals)
 Tihomir Kirov / Plamen Mihalev (quarter-finals)
 Florian Körber / Björn Wippich (third round)
 Oliver Colin /  Eric Wasylyk (third round)

Finals

Top half

Section 1

Section 2

Bottom half

Section 3

Section 4

Women's doubles

Seeds 

 Drífa Harðardóttir / Elsa Nielsen ( medalists)
 Claudia Vogelgsang /  Katja Wengberg (bronze medalists)
 Mhairi Armstrong / Suzanne Brewer (bronze medalists)
 Sarah Burgess / Claire Royall (second round)

Finals

Top half

Section 1

Section 2

Bottom half

Section 3

Section 4

Mixed doubles

Seeds 

 Alex Marritt / Rebecca Pantaney (silver medalists)
 Mark King / Mhairi Armstrong (third round)
 Esben B. Kæmpegaard / Helle Kæmpegaard (quarter-finals)
 Morten Eilby Rasmussen /  Claudia Vogelgsang (bronze medalists)
 Stefan Edvardsson / Katja Wengberg (third round)
 Björn Wippich / Jessica Willems (second round)
 Mark Constable / Lynne Swan (bronze medalists)
 Paul Freeman / Sarah Burgess (second round)

Finals

Top half

Section 1

Section 2

Bottom half

Section 3

Section 4

References 
Men's singles
Women's singles
Men's doubles
Women's doubles
Mixed doubles

2021 BWF World Senior Championships